Amina Ahmed is a Bangladesh Awami League politician and the former Member of Parliament from a reserved seat.

Career
Ahmed was elected to parliament from reserved seat as a Bangladesh Awami League candidate in 2014.

Early life
Ahmed is married to Professor Mozzaffar Ahmad, President of Bangladesh National Awami Party.

References

Awami League politicians
Living people
Women members of the Jatiya Sangsad
9th Jatiya Sangsad members
10th Jatiya Sangsad members
21st-century Bangladeshi women politicians
21st-century Bangladeshi politicians
Year of birth missing (living people)